The ¥5,000 note (五千円紙幣  gosen-en shihei) was first introduced in Japan in 1957 to the third series of banknote releases (Series C). The latest release is Series E (2004).

Series

Series C 
The green-brown note was introduced on 1 October 1957. It featured Prince Shōtoku and the headquarters of the Bank of Japan.

Series D 
The purple note was introduced on 1 November 1984. It featured Nitobe Inazō, Mount Fuji, and Lake Motosu.

Series E 
The series was released on 1 November 2004. The front side includes a portrait of Ichiyo Higuchi, a Meiji era writer and poet. The reverse side depicts Japanese irises (kakitsubata) from the Irises screen by Korin Ogata.

Extensive anti-counterfeiting measures are present in the banknote. They include intaglio printing, holograms, microprinting, fluorescent ink, latent images, watermarks, and angle-sensitive ink.

Series F 
On 9 April 2019, Finance Minister Tarō Asō announced new designs for the ¥1,000, ¥5,000, and ¥10,000 notes, for use beginning in 2024. The ¥5,000 bill will feature Tsuda Umeko and wisteria flowers.

References

See also

Banknotes of the Japanese yen

Japanese yen banknotes
Five-thousand-base-unit banknotes
Prince Shōtoku